Neurogenic locus notch homolog protein 2 (Notch 2) is a protein that in humans is encoded by the NOTCH2 gene.

NOTCH2 is associated with Alagille syndrome and Hajdu–Cheney syndrome.

Function 
Notch 2 is a member of the notch family. Members of this Type 1 transmembrane protein family share structural characteristics including an extracellular domain consisting of multiple epidermal growth factor-like (EGF) repeats, and an intracellular domain consisting of multiple, different domain types. Notch family members play a role in a variety of developmental processes by controlling cell fate decisions. The Notch signaling network is an evolutionarily conserved intercellular signaling pathway that regulates interactions between physically adjacent cells. In Drosophila, notch interaction with its cell-bound ligands (delta, serrate) establishes an intercellular signaling pathway that plays a key role in development. Homologues of the notch-ligands have also been identified in human, but precise interactions between these ligands and the human notch homologues remain to be determined. This protein is cleaved in the trans-Golgi network, and presented on the cell surface as a heterodimer. This protein functions as a receptor for membrane bound ligands, and may play a role in vascular, renal and hepatic development.

Mutations within the last coding exon of Notch2 that remove  the PEST domain and escape the nonsense-mediated mRNA decay have been shown to be the main cause of the Hajdu-Cheney syndrome.

Interactions 
NOTCH2 has been shown to interact with:
 Delta-like 1 
 GSK3B,
 JAG1,  and
 JAG2.

References

Further reading

External links 
  GeneReviews/NCBI/UW/NIH entry on Alagille syndrome
  OMIM entries on Alagille syndrome